Mönkhjantsangiin Ankhtsetseg (born ) is a Mongolian weightlifter, competing in the 69 kg category and representing Mongolia at international competitions. She won the gold medal in the women's 87kg event at the 2021 World Weightlifting Championships held in Tashkent, Uzbekistan.

She competed at world championships, including at the 2015 World Weightlifting Championships. She competed in the women's 69 kg event at the 2016 Summer Olympics. She also competed in the women's 87 kg event at the 2020 Summer Olympics in Tokyo, Japan.

She won the gold medal in her event at the 2022 Asian Weightlifting Championships held in Manama, Bahrain.

Major results

References

External links
 
 
 http://favoritos2016riodejaneiro.blogspot.com/2016/05/levantamento-de-peso-feminino-kg-69.html
 http://www.allthingsgym.com/category/ankhtsetseg-munkhjantsan/
 https://www.youtube.com/watch?v=jO79qzq_PlQ

1997 births
Living people
Mongolian female weightlifters
Weightlifters at the 2014 Summer Youth Olympics
Olympic weightlifters of Mongolia
Weightlifters at the 2016 Summer Olympics
Weightlifters at the 2020 Summer Olympics
World Weightlifting Championships medalists
21st-century Mongolian women